Folies Bergère de Paris is a 1935 American musical comedy film produced by Darryl Zanuck for 20th Century Films, directed by Roy Del Ruth and starring Maurice Chevalier, Merle Oberon and Ann Southern. At the 8th Academy Awards, the “Straw Hat” number, choreographed by Dave Gould, won the short-lived Academy Award for Best Dance Direction, sharing the honor with “I've Got a Feelin' You're Foolin'” from Broadway Melody of 1936.  The film, based on the 1934 play The Red Cat by Rudolph Lothar and Hans Adler, is a story of mistaken identity, with Maurice Chevalier playing both a music-hall star and a business tycoon who resembles him. This was Chevalier’s last film in Hollywood for twenty years, and reprised familiar themes such as the straw hat and a rendering of the French song "Valentine". This is also the last film to be distributed by Twentieth Century Pictures before it merged with Fox Film in 1935 to form 20th Century Fox.

Zanuck simultaneously produced a French-language version of the story, also directed by Roy Del Ruth, called L'homme des Folies Bergère. It stars Chevalier and Natalie Paley and Sim Viva. Because that film was intended for the French market, they shot scenes showing chorus girls bare breasted. When censor Joseph Breen heard of it, he insisted that the Production Code be enforced even in a film destined for another country. The American Film Institute catalog site describes Zanuck's losing battle with the censors.

The Red Cat, which was produced for the Broadway stage by Zanuck, ran for only 13 performances, but the studio benefited from four film adaptations. The third and fourth versions were in Technicolor, these being That Night in Rio, (1941) directed by Irving Cummings (and starring Don Ameche, Alice Faye and Carmen Miranda) followed by On the Riviera (1951), directed by Walter Lang (and starring Danny Kaye, Gene Tierney and Corinne Calvet).

Cast
 Maurice Chevalier as Eugene Charlier / Baron Fernand Cassini 
 Ann Sothern as Mimi
 Merle Oberon as Baroness Genevieve Cassini 
 Eric Blore as Francois 
 Ferdinand Munier as Morrisot 
 Walter Byron as Marquis René de Lac 
 Lumsden Hare as Gustave 
 Robert Greig as Henri
 Ferdinand Gottschalk as Perishot 
 Halliwell Hobbes as Monsieur Paulet 
 Georges Renavent as Premier of France
 Phillip Dare as Victor
 Frank McGlynn Sr. as Joseph 
 Barbara Leonard as Toinette 
 Olin Howland as Stage Manager

See also
 Folies Bergère

References

 Green, Stanley (1999) Hollywood Musicals Year by Year (2nd ed.), pub. Hal Leonard Corporation  page 41

External links

Folies Bergère de Paris at AFI catalog
L'homme des Folies Bergère at AFI catalog

L'homme des Folies Bergère at the TCM.com

1935 musical comedy films
1935 films
American black-and-white films
1930s English-language films
Films scored by Alfred Newman
Films directed by Roy Del Ruth
United Artists films
Twentieth Century Pictures films
American musical comedy films
Films produced by Darryl F. Zanuck
American multilingual films
1935 multilingual films
1930s American films